Richard Hughes may refer to:

 Sir Richard Hughes, 1st Baronet (c. 1708–1779), British naval commander, first of the Hughes baronets of East Bergholt in the County of Suffolk
 Sir Richard Hughes, 2nd Baronet (c. 1729–1812), British naval officer and Lieutenant-governor of Nova Scotia
 Richard Hughes (cricketer) (1926–2020), English cricketer
 Richard Hughes (footballer) (born 1979), Scottish footballer
 Richard Hughes (jockey) (born 1973), Irish jockey
 Richard Hughes (journalist) (1906–1984), Australian journalist
 Richard Hughes (musician) (born 1975), drummer with Keane
 Richard Hughes (British writer) (1900–1976), British writer
 Richard Bannister Hughes (1810–1875), British businessman, active in Uruguay
 Richard Cyril Hughes (born 1932), Welsh historian
 Richard E. Hughes (1909–1974), comics writer
 Richard J. Hughes (1909–1992), Governor of New Jersey in the 1960s, Chief Justice of New Jersey in the 1970s
 Richard N. Hughes (1927–2004), American television executive and television station editorialist
 Richard W. Hughes, American gemologist
 Richard Hughes (Archdeacon of Bangor) (1881–1962)
 Rick Hughes (born 1973), American basketball player
 Dick Hughes (baseball) (born 1938), baseball player
 Dick Hughes (footballer) (1902–1984), English footballer
 Dick Hughes (musician) (1931–2018), Australian musician
 Dick Hughes (American football) (born 1932), American football player
 Richy Hughes (born 1974), British Musical Theatre Lyricist

See also 
 Hughes (surname)